GFH may refer to:

 Ghetto Fighters' House, a museum in Israel
 Glens Falls Hospital, in New York, United States
 Global Flying Hospitals, a humanitarian medical charity
 GFH Financial Group, a Bahraini investment bank